The 27th Annual Gotham Independent Film Awards, presented by the Independent Filmmaker Project, were held on November 27, 2017. The nominees were announced on October 19, 2017. Actors Dustin Hoffman and Nicole Kidman, director Sofia Coppola, producer Jason Blum, cinematographer Ed Lachman and politician/environmentalist Al Gore received tribute awards. The ceremony was hosted by John Cameron Mitchell.

Winners and nominees

Film

Television

Special awards

Special Jury Award – Ensemble Performance
 Mudbound – Jonathan Banks, Mary J. Blige, Jason Clarke, Garrett Hedlund, Jason Mitchell, Rob Morgan, and Carey Mulligan

Made in NY Award
 Michael Kenneth Williams

Gotham Tributes
 Jason Blum
 Sofia Coppola
 Al Gore
 Dustin Hoffman
 Nicole Kidman
 Ed Lachman

References

External links
 

2017 film awards
2017